Sergey Ivanoviсh Neverov (born 21 December 1961, Tashtagol, Kemerovo Oblast) is a Russian political figure, deputy chairman of the State Duma of the Federal Assembly of VI, VII and VIII convocations. He was the parliamentary leader of United Russia since 9 October 2017 to 19 September 2021. He was the Secretary of the General Council of the party United Russia from 2011-2017.

He was formerly a member of the State Duma of the Russian Federation of the third (1999), fourth (2003) and the fifth (2007) convocations. Prior to 1991, consisted of the CPSU.

In July 2014, he was included in the sanctions list of the United States.

Family 
He is married to Olga Victorovna Neverova (born 1962), and they have two children.

Awards 
 Distinguished Miner of Kuzbass
 Order of Honour (2010)
 Order of Friendship (2014)
Medal of the Order For Merit to the Fatherland
 Certificate of Merit of the President of the Russian Federation

References

External links
 
 Сергей Иванович Неверов на сайте duma-er.ru
 Сергей Иванович Неверов. Биографическая справка на сайте  RIA Novosti 
 Сергей Иванович Неверов на сайте lobbying.ru

1961 births
Living people
People from Tashtagol
United Russia politicians
Recipients of the Medal of the Order "For Merit to the Fatherland" II class
Recipients of the Order of Honour (Russia)
21st-century Russian politicians
Russian individuals subject to the U.S. Department of the Treasury sanctions
Third convocation members of the State Duma (Russian Federation)
Fourth convocation members of the State Duma (Russian Federation)
Fifth convocation members of the State Duma (Russian Federation)
Sixth convocation members of the State Duma (Russian Federation)
Seventh convocation members of the State Duma (Russian Federation)
Eighth convocation members of the State Duma (Russian Federation)
Russian individuals subject to European Union sanctions